Mount Bigelow (also called the Bigelow Range and Bigelow Mountain) is a long mountain ridge with several summits.  It is located in Franklin County and Somerset County, Maine.  It is one of Maine's highest summits.  The mountain is named after Major Timothy Bigelow who climbed the rugged summit in late October 1775 "for the purpose of observation."  Major Bigelow was one of Colonel Benedict Arnold's four division commanders during the 1775 Invasion of Canada.  The expeditionary force passed along the Dead River on the northern edge of the Bigelow Range, now dammed into Flagstaff Lake.

Bigelow Mountain is part of the Rangeley-Stratton mountain range, which also includes Sugarloaf Mountain, Crocker Mountain, Saddleback Mountain, Mount Abraham and Mount Redington. 

The Appalachian Trail traverses Bigelow Mountain.  Much of the mountain and surrounding area is part of the  Bigelow Preserve, created in 1976 in response to a massive proposed ski resort.  The Maine Appalachian Trail Club (MATC) maintains the trails on Bigelow Mountain and stations seasonal caretakers at the popular backcountry campsites at Horns Pond and Bigelow Col.

By this same criteria, the South Horn of Bigelow, while under , qualifies for the New England Hundred Highest list.

In 1975, Bigelow Mountain was designated as a National Natural Landmark by the National Park Service.

Gallery

See also
 List of mountains in Maine

References

Mountains of Franklin County, Maine
Mountains of Somerset County, Maine
Bigelow
Bigelow
National Natural Landmarks in Maine